Jimmy Connors defeated Ken Rosewall in the final, 6–1, 6–0, 6–1 to win the men's singles tennis title at the 1974 U.S. Open. It set the record for the shortest ever major men's singles final, both in number of games and duration, lasting only 1 hour and 18 minutes and 20 games.

John Newcombe was the defending champion, but lost in the semifinals to Rosewall.

This was the last edition of the tournament to be played on grass courts; the following three years would feature clay courts, then hardcourts afterwards.

Seeds
The seeded players are listed below. Jimmy Connors is the champion; others show the round in which they were eliminated.

  Jimmy Connors (champion)
  John Newcombe (semifinalist)
  Stan Smith (quarterfinalist)
  Björn Borg (second round)
  Ken Rosewall (finalist)
  Tom Okker (fourth round)
  Ilie Năstase (third round)
  Arthur Ashe (quarterfinalist)
  Guillermo Vilas (fourth round)
  Manuel Orantes (second round)
  Marty Riessen (fourth round)
  Jan Kodeš (fourth round)
  Alex Metreveli (quarterfinalist)
  Dick Stockton (third round)
  Tom Gorman (second round)
  Raúl Ramírez (fourth round)

Draw

Key
 Q = Qualifier
 WC = Wild card
 LL = Lucky loser
 r = Retired

Final eight

Section 1

Section 2

Section 3

Section 4

Section 5

Section 6

Section 7

Section 8

References

External links
 Association of Tennis Professionals (ATP) – 1974 US Open Men's Singles draw
1974 US Open – Men's draws and results at the International Tennis Federation

Men's singles
US Open (tennis) by year – Men's singles